The Original Mountain Marathon (OMM), formerly known as the Karrimor International Mountain Marathon (or KIMM), and initially simply The Karrimor, is a two-day Mountain event, held in a different region across the UK every year. It was first held in 1968 and continues today.  Gerry Charnley, a skilled mountaineer and orienteer, designed the KIMM to test orienteering skills in extreme circumstances; the full-length KIMM course is a double-marathon length race.  Each team must carry all their gear, including equipment for an overnight camp.  Moreover, the course is not disclosed until the race begins, so each team must have good navigation skills.  Some have called the KIMM the forerunner of modern adventure racing.

History 

For its first 8 years, the event was known as 'The Karrimor'. In addition to the 'Elite category' double marathon, other course lengths have been added over the years to suit a greater variety of competitors (see 'Classes of competition' below). The core elements remain, however: there is always an overnight camp and the teams of two must be self-sufficient. 

The KIMM name was adopted in 1976.

After Galloway in 1976 which experienced exceptionally bad weather with only 30% completing, Gerry Charnley spoke in a TV interview with the BBC: "Don't you think this event is too tough?" asked the interviewer, and Charnley responded: "Everybody knows this is the KIMM, the toughest event on the calendar and it's not a Sunday afternoon picnic". This attitude has remained throughout the event's history and places it as one of the most challenging mountain marathons in the world.

In 1977, a special map from Harvey Maps was commissioned. 

In 2004 the event became known as the OMM after Karrimor's sponsorship was withdrawn.

The 2008 OMM was abandoned, for the first time in the race's history, due to ill-informed media coverage which suggested that the very challenging weather conditions (100 mph winds and extremely heavy rain) placed competitors and potential rescuers in danger. Reference was made to '1,700 people unaccounted for in the hills' though in fact all of these were still competing and unaware that anyone was concerned for them; as usual a significant number of competitors were current or former Mountain Rescue Team members. In fact only one competitor needed to be rescued after being swept away in a torrent, slightly injured and stranded on an island, though there were other unconnected rescues in the Lake District at the time which were widely assumed to be connected to the OMM. Flooding did cause considerable disruption and damage at the base camps and the high winds resulted in the abandonment of some of the staffed radio checkpoints; this and the genuine risk at river crossings were the principal reasons for cancelling the second day's competition.

In January 2010 the ownership of OMM, the event and the products was bought by Ark Consultants UK Ltd.

In 2013, the organisers of the Original Mountain Marathon revealed plans for a summer version of the event, along with a mountain biking marathon.

List of event locations

Classes of competition

OMM currently comprises six competition classes (three line events and three score courses) which vary in length and severity, approximately as follows:

 Elite 80 km 12 hrs
 A class 65 km 11 hrs
 B class 40 km 8 hrs 
 Long Score 7+6 hrs (day 1/2) 
 Medium Score 6+5hrs 
 Short Score 5+4hrs

Compulsory kit list

Warm Trousers or Leggings
Shirt or Thermal Top
Sweater or Fleece Top
Waterproof Over Trousers (taped seams)
Waterproof Jacket (taped seams)
Socks, gloves & hat
Head Torch
Whistle
Food For 36 Hours
Additional Emergency Rations
Compass (GPS Not Allowed)
Sleeping Bag
Footwear With Adequate Grip For Fell Conditions
Space Blanket or large heavy gauge polythene bag
Rucksack
First-Aid, a minimum of a crepe bandage and small wound dressings.
Pen Or Pencil
Tent With Sewn-In Groundsheet
Cooking Stove with enough fuel at the end of day 2 to make a hot drink

OMM Brand

OMM have started producing their own branded outdoor clothing and equipment. Items required on the event, such as waterproof jackets and trousers, backpacks and sleeping bags, have been produced, specially adapted for the event.
The Kamleika (from the Aleutian word for a long waterproof robe) range of jackets, smocks and trousers have become famous amongst mountain marathon runners and hikers. They are unique in that they are specially developed to be stretchy and produce minimal noise when running.

Swiss KIMM

1976 Swiss Orienteer Dieter Wolf brought the Karrimor International Mountain Marathon idea from England to Switzerland: 47 teams were at the start of the first Swiss Karrimor 2-day Mountain Marathon in Muotathal in 1976. Over the years several thousand lovers of the mountains, nature, orienteering and adventure sports from more than twenty countries have been able to participate in many different regions of the Swiss Alps.

After some structural and personnel changes at Karrimor ltd. in England and Salewa Sport ltd. in Switzerland, a new partner had to be found for the event in 1997 so as to achieve a balanced account. Arova-Mammut, a Swiss firm manufacturing mountain sport equipment, stepped in spontaneously, so that the event had to be changed only little; under a new name its organisation would be secure for the next few years.  The long cooperation with Arova-Mammut ltd. came to an end in 2002.

R’adys Outdoor & Snowwear in Lachen became a new sponsor in 2004. 2013 R'adys sponsorship ended and the Event is now called SIMM (Swiss International Mountain Marathon).

This Mountain Marathon is unique in Switzerland.

References

External links
Fellrunner magazine, back issues
KIMM/OMM Results 1999-2005
OMM
OMM Through the Years
Past OMM events 2012-2015
SIMM Swiss International Mountain Marathon
Stud marks on the Summit by Bill Smith, electronic version
team-ark.com distributors for the OMM brand
Upcoming OMMs

Multisports in the United Kingdom
Ultramarathons in the United Kingdom
Fell running competitions
Orienteering in the United Kingdom
Orienteering in Switzerland